Garrya is a genus of flowering plants in the family Garryaceae native to Mexico, the western United States, Central America and the Greater Antilles. Common names include silk tassel and tassel bush.

The flowers are gray-green catkins, short and spreading when first produced in late summer; the male catkins becoming long and pendulous in late winter when shedding pollen; the female catkins usually a little shorter and less pendulous. The fruit is a round dry berry containing two seeds.

Species
 Garrya buxifolia – dwarf silktassel; western Oregon, northern California
 Garrya congdonii – chaparral silktassel; California
 Garrya corvorum – Guatemala
 Garrya elliptica – coast silktassel, wavyleaf silktassel; western Oregon, western California
 Garrya fadyenii – Fadyen's silktassel; Cuba, Jamaica, Hispaniola; naturalised in Leeward Islands
 Garrya flavescens – ashy silktassel; California and Baja California, northeast to Utah and New Mexico
 Garrya fremontii – bearbrush silktassel; southern Washington, Oregon, California, northwestern Nevada
 Garrya glaberrima – Coahuila, Tamaulipas, Nuevo León
 Garrya grisea  – Baja California
 Garrya laurifolia – laurelleaf silktassel; widespread from Chihuahua and Tamaulipas south to Panama
 Garrya longifolia – Durango, Jalisco, Guerrero, Michoacán, Oaxaca, Morelos, Mexico State, Distrito Federal de México
 Garrya ovata – eggleaf silktassel; New Mexico, Texas, Chihuahua, Oaxaca
 Garrya salicifolia – willowleaf silktassel; Baja California, Baja California Sur
 Garrya veatchii – canyon silktassel; California, Baja California
 Garrya wrightii – Wright's silktassel; Arizona, New Mexico, Texas, Chihuahua, Sonora, Durango, Coahuila

Cultivation and uses
Some species, notably Garrya elliptica, are widely cultivated in gardens for their foliage and the catkins produced in late winter. They are frequently grown against a wall, or as a windbreak in coastal areas. The hybrids G. × issaquahensis (G. elliptica × G. fremontii) and G. × thuretii (G. elliptica × G. fadyenii) have been bred for garden planting.

References

External links 
Garrya map on DiscoverLife.org

Garryales
Flora of North America
Asterid genera